Myanmar Radio and Television (abbreviated MRTV), formerly the Burma Broadcasting Service (BBS), is the parent of the state-run Myanmar Radio National Service and the MRTV television channel. The television channels are broadcasting from its broadcast center in Kamayut, Yangon. The radio service is now broadcasting primarily from Naypyidaw.

History

Radio

Radio service in Myanmar first came on air in 1936 during the British colonial era. Regular programming by Bama Athan ("Voice of Burma") began in February 1946 when the British established Burma Broadcasting Service (BBS), carrying Burmese language national and foreign news and musical entertainment, knowledge reply and school lessons and  English language news and music programming. After independence in 1948, it was named Myanma Athan (also meaning Voice of Burma, but with the more formal term "Myanmar"). The service was renamed Myanmar Radio by the military government which came to power in 1988. The junta has also renamed the radio service's parent, BBS as Myanmar Radio and Television (MRTV) in 1997.

Until the launch of Yangon City FM in 2001, BBS/Myanmar Radio was the only radio station in the country. For years, its main broadcast centre is at 426 Pyay Road in Kamayut in Yangon. Since late 2007, the main broadcast station has moved to Naypyidaw. Yangon Station now mostly relays Naypyidaw Station's programming.

Television

Television service in Myanmar was first introduced in June 1979 as a test trial in Yangon. MRTV was first launched on 3 June 1980, and regular television service was formally launched in 1981 using the NTSC standard. In 2005, MRTV had 195 television relay stations throughout the country.

Expansion 
In October 2013, MRTV started broadcasting on digital terrestrial with DVB-T2 System, same as most ASEAN Countries. 18 TV channels and 3 Myanmar Radio channels are on MRTV multiplex system. MRTV plans the news interface, to the modern style of starting sequences and will have well-decorated news room. The broadcasting hours also increased to 18 hours (previously 10 hours).  On 15 February 2015, MRTV adding 5 new TV channels to their Multplex Play Out system, such as MRTV-4, Channel 7, 5 Plus, MNTV and Channel 9.  On 24 March 2018, MRTV adding 5 new TV channels to their Multiplex Play out System, such as Mizzima TV, DVB TV, Channel K, YTV and Fortune TV.  Since 2014, Myanmar Radio has broadcast on FM radio from dozens of relay stations nationwide.
It broadcasts 18 hours a day from 5:30 am to 11:30 pm (MMT).

See also

 Myanmar International
 MRTV-4
 Television in Burma
 Media of Burma
Myawaddy TV

References

External links
 Official site of MRTV (Burmese)

Mass media in Myanmar
Television channels in Myanmar
Radio stations established in 1936
Television channels and stations established in 1979
Mass media in Yangon
1936 establishments in Burma
Television in Myanmar